Ernest G. Eberhard (May 30, 1839 - January 16, 1910) was a German immigrant who founded the Grand Conservatory of New York City, of which he was president for about 40 years.  He was also an organist, conductor of choral societies and orchestras, author of musical instruction books and a publisher.

Eberhard founded the Grand Conservatory in 1874, with some help from the New York State Legislature. At a graduation ceremony, Theodore Roosevelt (then a state congressman), admitted to being involved in the legislation which allowed the conservatory to offer a Musical Doctor degree. Ernst Eberhard was the first to receive the doctorate.

Family
Eberhard married Caroline Louise Bogert in New York City, June 1876. Their children were Mrs. Edward Lansing, Mrs. Howard Hyde, Beatrice Eberhard ("well known violin virtuoso"), and Ernest G. Eberhard.

Books
Method for Piano, Course of Studies and Course in Technics (17 books)
Harmony and Counterpoint Simplified

Organist in
St Ann's Church, Brooklyn
Paulist Church, New York City
First Baptist Church, Manhattan

Conductor of
Newark Philharmonic Society

Director of
Parlor Opera Company
Student Concert Company

Newspaper correspondent
The Presto, Chicago
The American Israelite, Cincinnati

Clubs and associations
New York State Historical Association
New York Economic Club
Freemasonry

References

External links
IMSLP Petrucci Music Library, has large photo of him and one of his public domain works to download.

German emigrants to the United States
1839 births
1910 deaths
19th-century German musicians
19th-century German male musicians